Sirauli Ghauspur is a town in Barabanki district in the state of Uttar Pradesh, India. It is a Tehsil, Development Block and Nagar Panchayat.

Geography 
Siruli ghauspur is a village panchayat located in Barabanki district of Uttar Pradesh, state in India. The latitude 26.95 and longitude 81.43 are the geocoordinate of the Sirauli Ghauspur.

Demographics

Religion

According to the 2011 Census, the largest religious groupings are Hindus (70.30 per cent), followed by Muslims (29.34 per cent), Jains (0.10 per cent), Sikhs (0.05 per cent), and adherents of other religions (0.03 per cent).

Language 
Sirauli Ghauspur is Hindi, Urdu and most of the village people speak Hindi, Urdu. Sirauli Gauspur people use Hindi, Urdu language for communication.

References

External links 
 

Cities and towns in Barabanki district